Axali Doëseb (born 1954) is a Namibian music composer. He wrote and composed "Namibia, Land of the Brave", which has been the national anthem of the country since 1991. He has also served as conductor of the Namibian National Symphony Orchestra.

The composition of the National anthem was supervised by Hidipo Hamutenya, then chairman of the National Symbols subcommittee. In 2006 Hamutenya claimed that he authored the lyrics himself, "on the plane to Cuba", a claim that Doëseb denied.

Biography 
Doëseb was born in 1954 in Okahandja. Exposed to music during his school years, he took piano lessons at Martin Luther High School, Okombahe. He later composed liturgy for the Evangelical Lutheran Church in Namibia. Doëseb earned his degree in music at the Musikschule Herford (in Germany). In 1997, he earned a B.A. in Musicology at the University of Marlborough (United Kingdom).

As a well-known composer, Doëseb has been asked by several schools to write their school songs. He was also the chairman of the committee tasked with composing an anthem for the African Union in Addis Ababa, Ethiopia. In 2014, he was given a lifetime achievement award at the Namibian Annual Music Awards (NAMAs).

References

1954 births
Living people
Namibian composers
National anthem writers
Male composers
20th-century composers
20th-century male musicians
21st-century composers
21st-century male musicians